Khorgam Rural District is a rural district (dehestan) in Khorgam District, Rudbar County, Gilan Province, Iran. At the 2006 census, its population was 5,715, in 1,672 families. The rural district has 30 villages.

References 

Rural Districts of Gilan Province
Rudbar County